dBpm Records is an American record label based in Chicago, Illinois, and founded in 2011 by Grammy Award winning, alternative rock band Wilco. The label has released all of Wilco's albums since The Whole Love in 2011. It is aided by ADA for distribution. The label has also released Don't Lose This by Pop Staples; Sukierae, an album created by Jeff Tweedy and his son Spencer Tweedy; a set of solo albums by Jeff Tweedy called WARM + WARMER; and most recently, the final live album by the late Daniel Johnston, Chicago 2017.

Studio albums

References

American record labels
Wilco
2011 establishments in Illinois
Anti- (record label)